Charlotta Schlyter is a Swedish diplomat and Swedish Ambassador to Bangladesh. She joined as ambassador of Sweden Embassy in Dhaka in September 2017. Before that she was the Deputy Head of Mission at the Swedish Embassy located in Bangkok.

Early life
Schlyter graduated from the University of Stockholm in 1984 in French language and literature. From 1985 to 1989, she studied law at Uppsala University. She obtained her master's degree in law from the University of Toronto in 1990.

Career
Schlyter entered the Foreign Service in 1997.

References

Year of birth missing (living people)
Ambassadors of Sweden to Bangladesh
Stockholm University alumni
University of Toronto Faculty of Law alumni
Swedish women ambassadors
Living people
21st-century Swedish women